Gerad Ali Dable was the 13th Sultan of the Warsangali Sultanate, reigning from 1491 to 1503.

Dable was succeeded as Sultan by his eldest son, Garad Liban.

See also
Somali aristocratic and court titles

References
Warsangeli Sultanate

External links
Warsangeli Sultanate 

Somali sultans
15th-century Somalian people